The EPS Statistical and Nonlinear Physics Prize is a biannual award by the European Physical Society (EPS) given since 2017.  Its aim is to recognize 
outstanding research contributions in the area of statistical physics, nonlinear physics, complex systems, and complex networks.

Early Career Recipients

Senior Recipients

See also

 List of physics awards

References

Awards of the European Physical Society
Statistical mechanics